Lolita KompleX is an Austrian gothic rock band.

History
After the break-up of his former band Sanguis et Cinis, Eve Evangel founded Lolita KompleX in early 2008 to realize his idea of a Lolita fashion inspired, but independent Gothic Metal band.

Discography

Albums 
2011: Le Cabaret de Marionnettes 
2015: The Greatest Show on Earth
2019: ESCAPISM

Singles and EPs 
2013: "All the Things She Said" (t.A.T.u. cover)
2015: "Circus (Welcome to the)"
2018: Nutcracker EP
2019: "Stranger in a Strange Land"

References

Austrian gothic rock groups
Musical groups established in 2008